Norbert A. Kosinski (August 21, 1918–March 10, 1978) was an American politician.

Kosinski was born in Chicago, Illinois. He went to elementary and high schools in Chicago and business school in Poland. Kosinski served in the United States Army during World War II and was commissioned a sergeant. Kosinski served in the Illinois Senate from 1971 to his death in 1978. He was a Democrat. Kosinski died from a heart attack while at a fund-raising campaign rally in Chicago. Kosinski won the nomination in the Illinois Democratic primary election on March 21, 1978, after his death.

Notes

External links

1918 births
1978 deaths
Politicians from Chicago
Military personnel from Illinois
Democratic Party Illinois state senators
20th-century American politicians
United States Army personnel of World War II
American expatriates in Poland